Z21 may refer to:

Flitzer Z-21 or Staaken Flitzer, a British amateur-built aircraft produced by Flitzer Sportplanes of Aberdare, Wales
German destroyer Z21 Wilhelm Heidkamp, Type 1936-class destroyer built for the Kriegsmarine in the late 1930s
New South Wales Z21 class locomotive (formally L.304 class), a class of steam locomotives built for the New South Wales Government Railways in Australia
The 2013 album #Z21 by Sweetbox, or the lead single from that album
Fleischmann/Roco Z21, a digital model railroad control system